This is a list of lighthouses in Ukraine. All lighthouses are controlled by the Ukrainian state institution Derzhhidrohrafiya. There are over 100 lighthouses in Ukraine, five of them (all in Crimea) were taken over by Russia during the 2014 Russian intervention in Ukraine.

The Derzhhidrohrafiya (State Hydrographic Service of Ukraine) divides its area of responsibilities over the lighthouses into several districts (raions). There are four existing raions, operations two of which is temporarily suspended. In 2017 there was an additional raion created along Dnieper, Dnieper Raion.

Lighthouses

Odesa region

Mykolaiv region

Sevastopol region

Kerch region

Other lighthouses

Ukrainian Philately

See also
 Lists of lighthouses and lightvessels

References

External links

 
 
 
 
 The ARLHS list of all lighthouses in Ukraine
 Lykhovyd, O.M. Lighthouses and light-guiding signs (Маяки та маячні знаки). Skadovsk city website.
 List of lighthouses of the Derzhhidrohrafiya Mykolayivskyi District. Derzhhidrohrafiya (cached).
 List of lighthouses of the Derzhhidrohrafiya Odeskyi District. Derzhhidrohrafiya (cached).
 List of lighthouses of the Derzhhidrohrafiya Kerchenskyi District. Derzhhidrohrafiya (cached).
 List of lighthouses of the Derzhhidrohrafiya Mitin Sevastopolskyi District. Derzhhidrohrafiya (cached).

Ukraine

Lighthouses
Lighthouses